Together is an album by vocalist Joe Williams and trumpeter Harry "Sweets" Edison which was originally released on the Roulette label.

Reception 

AllMusic reviewer Scott Yanow stated "The Together set matches Williams and Edison with tenor saxophonist Jimmy Foster and a four-piece rhythm section that includes pianist Sir Charles Thompson. Among the highlights of the dozen standards are "I Don't Know Why", "Aren't You Glad You're You?", and "Lover Come Back to Me".

Track listing 
 "Winter Weather" (Ted Shapiro) – 1:52
 "I Don't Know Why (I Just Do)" (Fred E. Ahlert, Roy Turk) – 2:30
 "There's a Small Hotel" (Richard Rodgers, Lorenz Hart) – 2:19
 "Out of Nowhere" (Johnny Green, Edward Heyman) – 2:14
 "Aren't You Glad You're You?" (Jimmy Van Heusen, Johnny Burke) – 2:27 		
 "Remember" (Irving Berlin) – 1:52 
 "Together" (Buddy DeSylva, Lew Brown) – 2:28
 "Deep Purple" (Peter DeRose, Mitchell Parish) – 2:48
 "Always" (Berlin) – 2:37
 "Lover Came Back" (Victor Herbert, Frederika de Grasec, Harry B. Smith) – 4:05
 "By the River Sainte Marie" (Edgar Leslie]], Harry Warren) – 1:57
 "Alone Together" (Arthur Schwartz, Howard Dietz) – 2:30

Personnel 
Joe Williams – vocals
Harry "Sweets" Edison – trumpet
Jimmy Forrest – tenor saxophone
"Sir" Charles Thompson – piano
Tommy Potter – bass
Clarence Johnston – drums
Unidentified musician – guitar

References 

1961 albums
Joe Williams (jazz singer) albums
Harry Edison albums
Roulette Records albums
Albums produced by Teddy Reig
Collaborative albums